Darrick Minner (born April 28, 1990) is an American mixed martial artist who competed in the Featherweight division of the Ultimate Fighting Championship.

Background
Born in Auburn, Nebraska and raised in Nebraska City, Minner wrestled at Nebraska City High School. He then continued wrestling at Iowa Western Community College.

Mixed martial arts career

Early career

A professional mixed martial artist since October 2012 and representing Glory MMA and Fitness, Darrick Minner compiled a 24–10 record through 34 professional fights, the wins being 21 submissions, one knockout, and two decisions, during his days fighting on the regional MMA scene.

Dana White's Contender Series
Minner was invited to participate on Dana White's Contender Series 23 on August 9, 2019. He faced Herbert Burns, losing the bout via first-round submission.

Ultimate Fighting Championship
Minner made his UFC debut as an injury replacement for Chas Skelly against Grant Dawson on February 29, 2020, at UFC Fight Night: Benavidez vs. Figueiredo. At the weigh-ins, Dawson also failed to make weight, coming in at 149.5 pounds, 3.5 pounds over the featherweight non-title limit of 146 pounds. He was fined 30% of his fight purse, which went to Minner and the bout proceeded at a catchweight. Minner lost the fight via a submission in round two.

Minner was scheduled to fight a rematch with Jordan Griffin on June 13, 2020, at UFC Fight Night: Eye vs. Calvillo. However, on the day prior to the event, Minner was pulled from the fight due to health issues surrounding his weight cut and the bout was cancelled.

Minner faced T.J. Laramie on September 19, 2020, at UFC Fight Night: Covington vs. Woodley. He won the bout via guillotine choke in the first minute of the first round.

Minner faced Charles Rosa on February 20, 2021, at UFC Fight Night: Blaydes vs. Lewis. He won the fight via unanimous decision.

Minner faced Darren Elkins on July 24, 2021, at UFC on ESPN: Sandhagen vs. Dillashaw. He lost the fight via a technical knockout in round two.

Having fought out his previous contract, Minner signed a new four-fight deal and faced Ryan Hall on December 11, 2021, at UFC 269. He lost the bout via unanimous decision.

Minner was scheduled to face Damon Jackson on June 4, 2022 at UFC Fight Night 207.  However, for undisclosed reasons, Minner was pulled from the event and he was replaced by newcomer Daniel Argueta.

Last fight in the UFC, suspension and investigations
Minner faced Shayilan Nuerdanbieke on November 5, 2022 at UFC Fight Night 214. He lost the fight via technical knockout in the first round after seemingly injuring his knee seconds into the bout.

On December 2, 2022, Minner was released from the UFC amid an investigation into suspicious betting patterns that occurred in his previous fight against Shayilan Nuerdanbieke. Subsequently, both Minner and his coach James Krause were indefinitely suspended by the Nevada State Athletic Commission for failing to disclose the injury Minner had sustained prior the fight.

Personal life
Minner and his wife Jordyn have three daughters, Brixtyn, Brogyn and Brynn. His younger brothers Brady and Brett are also MMA fighters, mostly with the Omaha-based promotion Dynasty Combat Sports.

Championships and accomplishments
Dynasty Combat Sports
DCS Featherweight Champion (one time; former)
One successful title defense

Mixed martial arts record

|-
|Loss
|align=center|26–14
|Shayilan Nuerdanbieke
|TKO (elbows)
|UFC Fight Night: Rodriguez vs. Lemos
|
|align=center|1
|align=center|1:07
|Las Vegas, Nevada, United States
|
|-
|Loss
|align=center|26–13
|Ryan Hall
|Decision (unanimous)
|UFC 269
|
|align=center|3
|align=center|5:00
|Las Vegas, Nevada, United States
|
|-
|Loss
|align=center|26–12
|Darren Elkins
|TKO (punches)
|UFC on ESPN: Sandhagen vs. Dillashaw 
|
|align=center|2
|align=center|3:48
|Las Vegas, Nevada, United States
|
|-
|Win
|align=center| 26–11
|Charles Rosa
|Decision (unanimous)
|UFC Fight Night: Blaydes vs. Lewis
|
|align=center|3
|align=center|5:00
|Las Vegas, Nevada, United States
| 
|-
| Win
| align=center| 25–11
| T.J. Laramie
| Submission (guillotine choke)
|UFC Fight Night: Covington vs. Woodley
| 
| align=center| 1
| align=center| 0:52
| Las Vegas, Nevada, United States
| 
|-
| Loss
| align=center| 24–11
| Grant Dawson
|Submission (rear-naked choke)
|UFC Fight Night: Benavidez vs. Figueiredo
|
|align=center|2
|align=center|1:38
|Norfolk, Virginia, United States
|
|-
| Win
| align=center| 24–10
| Charlie DuBray
|Technical Submission (shoulder choke)
|DCS 57
|
|align=center|1
|align=center|1:33
|Lincoln, Nebraska, United States
|
|-
| Win
| align=center| 23–10
| Terrance McKinney
| Submission (triangle choke)
| Midwest CF 18
| 
| align=center| 1
| align=center| 0:57
| North Platte, Nebraska, United States
|
|-
| Loss
| align=center| 22–10
| Herbert Burns
| Submission (triangle armbar)
| Dana White's Contender Series 23
| 
| align=center| 1
| align=center| 2:29
| Las Vegas, Nevada, United States
|
|-
| Win
| align=center|22–9
| Clay Collard
|Submission (rear-naked choke)
|Final Fight Championship 33: Chub vs. Vrtačić
|
|align=center|1
|align=center|0:31
|Las Vegas, Nevada, United States
|
|-
| Loss
| align=center| 21–9
| Kevin Croom
| TKO (elbows)
|LFA 48
|
| align=center|2
| align=center|2:10
|Kearney, Nebraska, United States
|
|-
| Win
| align=center|21–8
| Joey Munoz
|Submission (rear-naked choke)
| DCS 41
| 
| align=center|2
| align=center|4:50
| Lincoln, Nebraska, United States
|
|-
| Loss
| align=center| 20–8
| Jordan Griffin
|Submission (armbar)
|LFA 34
|
|align=center|2
|align=center|3:59
|Prior Lake, Minnesota, United States
| 
|-
| Win
| align=center| 20–7
| Chuka Willis
| Submission (guillotine choke)
| DCS 38
|
|align=Center|1
|align=center|2:45
|Lincoln, Nebraska, United States
| 
|-
| Loss
| align=center| 19–7
| Fernando Padilla
|Submission (triangle armbar)
|LFA 25
|
|align=center|1
|align=center|3:10
|Omaha, Nebraska, United States
|
|-
| Win
| align=center| 19–6
| Will Shutt
| Submission (guillotine choke)
|VFC 58
|
|align=center|2
|align=center|2:48
|Omaha, Nebraska, United States
| 
|-
| Win
| align=center| 18–6
|Justin Overton
| Submission (guillotine choke)
| VFC 57
| 
| align=center| 1
| align=center| 1:20
| Topeka, Kansas, United States
| 
|-
| Loss
| align=center| 17–6
| Chico Camus
|Decision (unanimous)
|LFA 2
|
|align=center| 3
|align=center| 5:00
|Prior Lake, Minnesota, United States
|
|-
| Win
| align=center|17–5
| Zakk Smith
| Submission (guillotine choke)
| DCS 27
| 
| align=center| 1
| align=center| 0:47
| Nebraska City, Nebraska, United States
|
|-
| Win
| align=center|16–5
| Bill Kamery
| Submission (triangle choke)
| DCS 25
| 
| align=center|1
| align=center|4:35
| Lincoln, Nebraska, United States
| 
|-
| Loss
| align=center| 15–5
| Jesse Arnett
| Submission (brabo choke)
| Hard Knocks 48
|
|align=Center|2
|align=center|1:56
|Calgary, Canada
| 
|-
| Win
| align=center| 15–4
| Brandon Ball
| Submission (armbar)
| DCS 22
| 
| align=center| 1
| align=center| 1:00
| Lincoln, Nebraska, United States
|
|-
| Win
| align=center| 14–4
| Matt Brown
| Submission (guillotine choke)
| RFA 30
| 
| align=center| 1
| align=center| 1:35
| Lincoln, Nebraska, United States
| 
|-
|  Win
| align=center| 13–4
| Erik Vo
| Submission (rear-naked choke)
| DCS 17
| 
| align=center| 1
| align=center| 1:31
| Nebraska City, Nebraska, United States
| 
|-
|  Win
| align=center| 12–4
| Marvin Blumer
| Decision (unanimous)
|RFA 24
|
|align=center|3
|align=center|5:00
|Prior Lake, Minnesota, United States
|
|-
| Win
| align=center| 11–4
| Shaine Moffitt
| Submission (guillotine choke)
|DCS 14
|
|align=center|1
|align=center|0:40
|Tarkio, Missouri, United States
| 
|-
| Win
| align=center| 10–4
| Jordan Hernandez
| Submission (kneebar)
|DCS 12
|
|align=center|1 
|align=center|1:49
|Lincoln, Nebraska, United States
|
|-
| Loss
| align=center| 9–4
| Luke Sanders
|TKO (punches)
|RFA 17
|
|align=center|2
|align=center|3:15
|Sioux Falls, South Dakota, United States
|
|-
| Win
| align=center| 9–3
| Tony Crowder
| Submission (guillotine choke)
| DCS 9
| 
| align=center| 1
| align=center| 0:33
| Nebraska City, Nebraska, United States
|
|-
| Win
| align=center|8–3
| Austin Lyons
| Submission (armbar)
| RFA 13
| 
| align=center|1
| align=center|3:39
| Lincoln, Nebraska, United States
|
|-
| Loss
| align=center|7–3
| John DeVall
|Submission (armbar)
|DCS 6
|
|align=center|1
|align=center|4:38
|Omaha, Nebraska, United States
|
|-
| Win
| align=center|7–2
| William Osborne
| Decision (unanimous)
|RFA 10
| 
| align=center|3
| align=center|5:00
| Des Moines, Iowa, United States
|
|-
| Win
| align=center|6–2
| Robert Flaherty
|TKO (punches)
| DCS 3
| 
| align=center|1
| align=center|1:14
| Omaha, Nebraska, United States
|
|-
| Loss
| align=center| 5–2
| Chad Obermiller
| Submission (triangle choke)
| DCS 1
| 
| align=center| 1
| align=center| 3:22
| Grand Island, Nebraska, United States
|Return to Bantamweight.
|-
| Win
| align=center| 5–1
| Justin Morrison
| Submission (guillotine choke)
| Disorderly Conduct 20
|
|align=Center|1
|align=center|1:13
|Nebraska City, Nebraska, United States
|Featherweight debut.
|-
| Win
| align=center| 4–1
| Adem Mujakic
| Submission (guillotine choke)
| Disorderly Conduct 18
| 
| align=center| 1
| align=center| 2:04
|Lincoln, Nebraska, United States
| 
|-
| Win
| align=center| 3–1
| Hector Velez
| Submission (guillotine choke)
|Centurion Fights
|
|align=center|1
|align=center|1:07
|St. Joseph, Missouri, United States
| 
|-
| Win
| align=center| 2–1
|DeAndrew Jones
| Submission (rear-naked choke)
| Disorderly Conduct 15
| 
| align=center| 1
| align=center| 2:21
| Omaha, Nebraska, United States
| 
|-
| Win
| align=center| 1–1
| James Smith
| Submission (rear-naked choke)
| Disorderly Conduct 14
| 
| align=center| 1
| align=center| 0:25
| Lincoln, Nebraska, United States
|
|-
| Loss
| align=center| 0–1
| Dominic Blanco
| Submission (guillotine choke)
| Disorderly Conduct 12
| 
| align=center| 1
| align=center| 1:13
| North Platte, Nebraska, United States
|

See also 
 List of male mixed martial artists

References

External links 
  
 

1990 births
Living people
American male mixed martial artists
Welterweight mixed martial artists
Mixed martial artists utilizing collegiate wrestling
Ultimate Fighting Championship male fighters
American male sport wrestlers
Amateur wrestlers